La Haye-du-Puits is a former commune in the Manche department in Normandy in north-western France. On 1 January 2016, it was merged into the new commune of La Haye.

Heraldry

See also
History of Witchcraft in La Haye-du-Puits
Communes of the Manche department

References 

Hayedupuits